The 2016 Wisconsin Democratic presidential primary was held on April 5 in the U.S. state of Wisconsin as one of the Democratic Party's primaries ahead of the 2016 presidential election. Vermont senator Bernie Sanders won the contest with 56.5%, distancing nationwide frontrunner Hillary Clinton by 13 percentage points.

The Wisconsin Republican primary, held on the same day in conjunction with the Democratic primary, yielded a win for Ted Cruz, who distanced nationwide frontrunner Donald Trump by 13%. With no other primaries being scheduled for that day by either party and just two weeks ahead of the important New York primary, the Wisconsin primary was in the national spotlight.

The two parties' primaries were held in conjunction with this year's Wisconsin judicial elections, where Wisconsin Supreme Court justice Rebecca Bradley was confirmed for a 10-year elected term, winning over Appeals Court judge JoAnne Kloppenburg.

Wisconsin provided a friendly setting for Sanders's brand of economic populism. Liberals made up two-thirds of the majority-white primary electorate, and the economy, followed by income inequality, were of top concern to voters, according to exit polls.

Clinton lost Wisconsin by a narrow margin in the general election, against Republican nominee Donald Trump.

Procedure

State primary procedure
As Wisconsin held an open primary, residents could choose freely which party's primary they wished to participate in, when showing up at the polls on election day, regardless of their official registration with either party or none. Polling stations were opened between 7 a.m. and 8 p.m. Central Time.

The two parties' primaries were held in conjunction with this year's Wisconsin judicial elections that included the election of the Wisconsin Supreme Court justice.

Democratic nomination procedure
The Democratic Party of Wisconsin pledges only 86 out of 96 delegates to the 2016 Democratic National Convention based on the popular vote at the primary election on the basis of proportional apportion. However, only the 18 at-large delegates and 10 pledged "Party Leaders and Elected Officials" (PLEOs) are apportioned according to the statewide vote, while the 57 district delegates are apportioned according to the vote within each of the state's eight congressional districts. The remaining ten Wisconsin delegates are unpledged "Party Leaders and Elected Officials" (PLEOs), or "Superdelegates", who may vote for whomever they wish at the party's upcoming National Convention.

Candidates
While three candidates appeared on the Democratic primary ballot, only Bernie Sanders and Hillary Clinton actively campaigned for the Wisconsin contest, after Martin O'Malley had already suspended his campaign.

Presidential debate in Milwaukee, February 2016

The Democratic Party held its sixth presidential debate on February 11, 2016 in Milwaukee, at the University of Wisconsin–Milwaukee. Moderated by PBS NewsHour anchors Gwen Ifill and Judy Woodruff, the debate aired on PBS and was simulcast by CNN. Participants were Hillary Clinton and Bernie Sanders.

Opinion polling

Results

Results by county

Detailed results per congressional district

Analysis

Bernie Sanders scored a large victory in Wisconsin, a largely liberal and big manufacturing state. He was bolstered by a 73-26 showing among younger voters, a 64-35 showing among men, a 72-28 showing among self-identified Independents, and a 59-40 showing among white voters who comprised 83% of the electorate in the Cheese State. Sanders also won women 50–49, but lost African American voters to Clinton, 69–31. Sanders swept all income and educational attainment levels in Wisconsin.

Sanders won unions 54–46, a key demographic in the industrial Rust Belt.

Sanders swept all counties in Wisconsin but one. He was victorious in the southeast 55–45, in the southwest 62–38, and in rural northeastern and northwestern Wisconsin 57–42. He carried the major cities of Madison, which has a younger electorate, as well as Eau Claire, Green Bay, Oshkosh, and Kenosha. Clinton won in Milwaukee 51–48, likely thanks to her ardent African-American support.

References

Wisconsin
Democratic primary
2016